Ōtāhuhu is a suburb of Auckland, New Zealand –  to the southeast of the CBD, on a narrow isthmus between an arm of the Manukau Harbour to the west and the Tāmaki River estuary to the east. As the southernmost suburb of the former Auckland City, it is considered part of South Auckland.

The suburb's name is taken from the Māori-language name of the volcanic cone known as Ōtāhuhu / Mount Richmond. The name refers to "the place of Tāhuhu" — the eponymous ancestor, Tāhuhu-nui-a-Rangi, of Ngāi Tāhuhu.

Demographics

Ōtāhuhu had a population of 15,165 at the 2018 New Zealand census, an increase of 1,599 people (11.8%) since the 2013 census, and an increase of 2,262 people (17.5%) since the 2006 census. There were 3,921 households, comprising 7,815 males and 7,353 females, giving a sex ratio of 1.06 males per female, with 3,669 people (24.2%) aged under 15 years, 3,804 (25.1%) aged 15 to 29, 6,486 (42.8%) aged 30 to 64, and 1,194 (7.9%) aged 65 or older.

Ethnicities were 20.4% European/Pākehā, 15.3% Māori, 47.9% Pacific peoples, 28.8% Asian, and 1.7% other ethnicities. People may identify with more than one ethnicity.

The percentage of people born overseas was 46.1, compared with 27.1% nationally.

Although some people chose not to answer the census's question about religious affiliation, 21.0% had no religion, 51.2% were Christian, 1.9% had Māori religious beliefs, 9.4% were Hindu, 5.9% were Muslim, 2.3% were Buddhist and 3.1% had other religions.

Of those at least 15 years old, 1,413 (12.3%) people had a bachelor's or higher degree, and 2,574 (22.4%) people had no formal qualifications. 822 people (7.2%) earned over $70,000 compared to 17.2% nationally. The employment status of those at least 15 was that 5,496 (47.8%) people were employed full-time, 1,323 (11.5%) were part-time, and 777 (6.8%) were unemployed.

History 

The area is named after Tāhuhunui-o-te-rangi, captain of the Moekākara waka, and who settled on Ōtāhuhu and in Northland, his descendants becoming the Ngāi Tāhuhu iwi. Portage Road, which runs between the Manukau Harbour and Ōtāhuhu Creek, was originally Te Tō Waka, a portage for waka between the Manukau and Waitemata harbours. This portage is traditionally associated as the place where the Tainui waka was hauled between the Tamaki River and Manukau Harbour. In the early 1800s, the portage was used by Ngāpuhi during the Musket Wars, to attack Tainui tribes in the Waikato.

The suburb was established in 1847 as a fencible settlement, where soldiers were given land with the implied understanding that in wartime, they would be raised as units to defend it (however, the eventual fighting a decade later used professional soldiers instead). Most early features from this time have disappeared, however, such as a stone bridge built by the fencibles that had to make way to a widening of Great South Road. By the 1870s, Ōtāhuhu became the largest agricultural town in the Auckland Province, facilitated by the trade of wheat and other agricultural products to the city of Auckland, trading along the Tāmaki River. In December 1873 the Southern Line opened, connecting the township of Auckland to Penrose. A year and a half later on 20 May 1875, the line was extended south and the Ōtāhuhu railway station was opened.

The first supermarket in the country was opened in Ōtāhuhu on 18 June 1958, when the first Foodtown was opened by Tom Ah Chee, who pooled his resources with two other Auckland produce shop owners, Norman Kent and John Brown. Many famous personalities went to Otahuhu College, including heavyweight boxing champion David Tua, former prime minister David Lange, and ex-Manukau City Mayor, Sir Barry Curtis.

Local government 
Otahuhu had a local government just like other suburbs of Auckland at that time. The local government was called Otahuhu Borough Council, which started in 1912 and merged into Auckland City Council in 1985, eventually amalgamated into Auckland Council in November 2010.

Mayors during Otahuhu Borough Council 
Alfred Sturges, 1912–1915
James Atkinson, 1915–1917
Alfred MacDonald, 1917–1921
Robert Black Todd, 1921–1929
Hubert Thomas Clements, 1929–1935
Charles Robert Petrie, 1935–1944
Albert Murdoch, 1944–1950
James Deas, 1950–1954
John "Jack" David Murdoch, 1954–1962
Robert G. Ashby, 1962–1965
Aubray Thayer Bedingfield, 1965–1970
Claude H. D. Handisides, 1970–1977
Niall Frederick Burgess, 1977–1985

Education

The schools are across the street from each other.

Years 9–11 are boys only, and years 12 and 13 are coeducational.

Mt Richmond School is a special school for students with intellectual disabilities.

All these schools except McAuley High School and King's College (as noted above) are coeducational. Rolls are as of

Community facilities 
Giac Nhien Temple, a Vietnamese Buddhist temple is located in the suburb.

Transport 
Ōtāhuhu, in its position on a narrow section of the Auckland isthmus, is an important part of Auckland's southern transportation approaches for both road and rail, containing a combined bus interchange and Otahuhu railway station. The new bus-train interchange opened on 29 October 2016 as a joint Auckland Transport and NZ Transport Agency initiative costing NZ$28M.

"The station is at the heart of the Southern New Network", said Auckland Transport's Chief AT Metro Officer, Mark Lambert. "Auckland is moving towards a more connected network of local feeder services connecting with frequent bus and train services. Bus and train transport hubs like Ōtāhuhu are at the heart of this transformation."

The old bus interchange, which was badly neglected, and had received increased attention from early 2011 on for vandalism/graffiti prevention measures is now closed and a smaller bus stop has been installed on the main road near the town centre.

Present day 
Otahuhu nowadays is synonymous with industry and along with its neighbouring suburbs Favona, Māngere East, Mt Wellington, Penrose and Westfield forms an industrial conglomerate zone that spans much of the Māngere Inlet. The community and town centre flourishes as the crossroad to Central and South Auckland and is home to a sizable Pacific Island populace.

Sport and recreation
Otahuhu is home to the Otahuhu Rugby Football Club and the Otahuhu Leopards rugby league club.

References

External links 
Photographs of Otahuhu held in Auckland Libraries' heritage collections

Suburbs of Auckland
Māngere-Ōtāhuhu Local Board Area
Populated places around the Manukau Harbour
Populated places on the Tāmaki River